San Francisco Church may refer to:

 San Francisco Church (Valparaíso), Chile
 San Francisco Church (Antigua Guatemala), Guatemala
 San Francisco Church (Intramuros), Philippines
 San Francisco Church (La Paz), Bolivia
 San Francisco Church, Santiago de Chile, Chile

See also
Roman Catholic Archdiocese of San Francisco, California
Roman Catholic Diocese of San Francisco, Argentina
:Category:Churches in San Francisco, California